A.O. Pefki Football Club is a Greek football club, based in Pefki, Attica.

The club was founded in 1938. They will play in Football League 2 for the season 2013–14.

Honors

Domestic Titles and honors
 Athens Champions: 4
 1988–89, 1992–93, 2007–08, 2011-12
 Athens Cup Winners: 1
 1986-87

 
Football clubs in Athens
Football clubs in Attica
Association football clubs established in 1938
1938 establishments in Greece